Kotomi (written: , ,  or  in hiragana) is a feminine Japanese given name. Its meaning comes from the koto  which is a Japanese stringed instrument, and -mi , a name suffix meaning "beauty" or "beautiful", but depending on the kanji used it can have many different meanings. Notable people with the name include:

, Japanese manga artist
, Japanese curler
, Japanese actress
, Japanese tennis player
, Japanese actress
, Japanese volleyball player
, Japanese women's shogi player 
Kotomi (born 1996), Japanese kickboxer

Fictional characters 
, a character in the visual novel Clannad
, a character in the manga series Itazura na Kiss
, a character in the manga series DNA²
, a character in the manga series Seitokai Yakuindomo

Japanese feminine given names